Pâ Forest is a protected forest in Burkina Faso. 
It is located in Balé Province.

Protected areas of Burkina Faso
Balé Province